Martin Quinn (born 24 December 1949) is an Irish Fianna Fáil politician. He was Mayor of Galway from 2000 to 2001.

Quinn was born in Galway's College Road on Christmas Eve, 1949. His parents were Frank Quinn and Maureen Linnane, both of Ardrahan, who married in 1935. Frank was related to Ellen Quinn who was killed during the Irish War of Independence. He was the twelfth of nineteen children. 

Quinn served with the CIÉ from 1969, serving mainly the west of Ireland. Active since then in trade unions and politics, he was selected in 1998 as a candidate by Fianna Fáil for the next local elections. He was elected in June 1999 for Galway's West Ward. His first meeting as Mayor took place on 10 July 2000, and became notable as the then-longest continuous meeting of Galway City Council; the issue was the Connacht Waste Management Programme, including a proposal for incineration, and it lasted over four and a half hours. 

During his term he oversaw housing developments in Doughiska, the opening of Bruach na Coirbe, Westside Boxing Club, the establishment of the strategic Policy Committees, the Corporate Policy Group and the City Development board. 

Quinn is perhaps unique in being the only modern Mayor who can trace his genealogy back to the Tribes of Galway, as he is descended from the Bodkin family.

References
 The Tribes of Galway, Adrian James Martyn, Galway, 2001.
 Role of Honour:The Mayors of Galway City 1485-2001, William Henry, Galway 2001.

External links
 https://web.archive.org/web/20071119083053/http://www.galwaycity.ie/AllServices/YourCouncil/HistoryofTheCityCouncil/PreviousMayors/

  

Politicians from County Galway
Mayors of Galway
Fianna Fáil politicians
1949 births
Living people
Local councillors in Galway (city)